Agastya Samhita is the title of several works in Sanskrit text attributed to the ancient sage (rishi) Agastya.

Pancharatra 
One of the samhitas of the Pāñcarātrāgama is the Agastya Saṁhitā, which is about the worshipping of Rāma, Sītā, Lakṣmaṇa, and Hanumān, as laid down by Agastya. It is also known as Agastya-Sutīkṣṇa-Samvāda, as it is in the form of a conversation between the sages Sutīkṣṇa and Agastya. 

There are also other works titled Agastya Samhita among the Pancharatra texts, which are different from Sutīkṣṇa-Agastya-samvāda.

Puranas 
Sections of certain Puranas believed to have been written by Agastya are called Agastya Samhita as well.

Skanda Purana 
A section embedded in Skanda Purana is known as Agastya Samhita, and sometimes called the Sankara Samhita. It was probably composed in late medieval era, but before the 12th-century. It exists in many versions, and is structured as a dialogue between Skanda and Agastya. Scholars such as Moriz Winternitz state that the authenticity of the surviving version of this document is doubtful because Shaiva celebrities such as Skanda and Agastya teach Vaishnavism ideas and the bhakti (devotional worship) of Rama, mixed in with a tourist guide about Shiva temples in Varanasi and other parts of India.

Garuda Purana 
Agastya Samhita is the name of one of the three sections of Garuda Purana which deals with the study of gems; the other two being the Brihaspati Samhita (Nitisara) and the Dhanvantari Samhita which is a study on material science, jurisprudence and medicine.

Notes

References

Sources
Printed sources
Printed edition of an Agastya Samhita from the Internet archive, in Bengali script.
Manuscript titled "Agastyasaṃhitā" from the Raghunatha Temple Library, Jammu, India, now scanned and at the Internet Archive.  There are several texts of this name.  This is the conversation between Sutīkṣṇa and Agastya, in the Pārvatī-Śiva conversation, described as a Pāñcarātra text.  See V. Raghavan, New Catalogus Catalogorum (1968--), v.1, pp. 20--21.
 
 
Web sources

External links
Agastya Samhita in Garuda Purana (Wisdom Library) 
Places where words Agastya Saṁhitā are used (vedabase.net)
Did an Ancient Indian Sage Record a Recipe for Making a Battery? A Forgotten Chapter in Fringe History, Jason Colavito

Vaishnavism
Hindu texts